Adrian Wall may refer to:

Adrian Wall (footballer), former Sheffield Wednesday player
Adrian Wall (Doctor Who), Doctor Who character from the Bernice Summerfield stories

See also

Hadrian's Wall, a defensive fortification in Roman Britain